Hova may refer to:
 Jay-Z, an  American rapper, businessman
 Hova (Madagascar), one of the three main social classes in the pre-colonial Kingdom of Imerina in Madagascar
 Hova, Sweden, a locality
 Battle of Hova, fought in 1275
 French destroyer Hova, a French ship which served in World War I
 , a World War II Free French and post-war French Navy frigate
 Helge Høva (1928–2010), Norwegian politician
 Hova, a character in the 2006 animated movie The Ant Bully, voiced by Julia Roberts